South Newton High School is a multi-community high school consisting of grades 9-12 located in rural Newton County, between the incorporated towns of Kentland, Brook, and Goodland, Indiana.  The Elementary and Middle School facilities are located adjacent to the high school.

About
The school has more than 250 students and is classified as a 1A school by the IHSAA.  The schools colors are red, gray and white.  The mascot for South Newton is the Rebels.

Athletics
The South Newton Rebels became the first Indiana high school to join an athletic conference located in Illinois. They will start play in the Sangamon Valley Conference in 2015 following the breakup of the Midwest Conference in Indiana.  (Mt. Carmel, Illinois currently competes in a conference located in Indiana.)

Notable alumni
 Tracy Smith (1984) – Head coach of the Arizona State Sun Devils baseball team. Former head coach of the Miami RedHawks baseball team and Indiana Hoosiers baseball team.
Louis Sola (1986) – Commissioner of the U.S. Federal Maritime Commission.

See also
 List of high schools in Indiana

References

External links

 Gagliardi Trophy 

Public high schools in Indiana
Education in Newton County, Indiana